7th meridian may refer to:

7th meridian east, a line of longitude east of the Greenwich Meridian
7th meridian west, a line of longitude west of the Greenwich Meridian
The Seventh Meridian of the Dominion Land Survey in Canada, 122° west of Greenwich